is a professional Japanese baseball player. He plays infielder for the Hiroshima Toyo Carp.

Personal life
He is married with former TBS announcer Erina Masuda on November 6, 2014. He has one child, a boy.

External links

 NPB.com

1991 births
Living people
People from Toyota, Aichi
Hiroshima Toyo Carp players
Japanese baseball players
Nippon Professional Baseball first basemen
Nippon Professional Baseball right fielders
Nippon Professional Baseball third basemen
Baseball people from Aichi Prefecture